The 1930 North Dakota Fighting Sioux football team was an American football team that represented the University of North Dakota in the North Central Conference (NCC) during the 1930 college football season. In its second year under head coach Charles A. West, the team compiled a 9–1 record (4–0 against NCC opponents), won the conference championship, and outscored opponents by a total of 202 to 55.

Schedule

References

North Dakota
North Dakota Fighting Hawks football seasons
North Central Conference football champion seasons
North Dakota Fighting Sioux football